Ronche is a hamlet of about 70 people in the Friuli-Venezia Giulia region of north east Italy. It is a frazione of the comune of Sacile, in the province of Pordenone.

Geography
It is located about 15 km east of the provincial capital of Pordenone.

The population

Economy
The area is home to a number of United States nationals who work at the nearby Aviano Air Base. Brick-making started in Ronche in the fourteenth century and continued until 1957. Today the main economic activity is farming. The piano company of Fazioli is based in the area.

Events
The Sagra delle brombolete, a festival dedicated to a variety of small yellow plum, is held on the third Sunday of July.

External links
 Ronche: A brief description of the hamlet.

Frazioni of the Province of Pordenone